The Stade L.P. Gaucher is a multi-purpose arena in Saint-Hyacinthe, Quebec. It has a capacity of 2,048 and was built in 1937. It was home to the Saint-Hyacinthe Laser of the Quebec Major Junior Hockey League from 1989 to 1996. The arena hosted teams in the Ligue Nord-Américaine de Hockey from 2001 to 2009, the last of which was the Saint-Hyacinthe Chiefs.

References

Indoor ice hockey venues in Canada
Indoor arenas in Quebec
Quebec Major Junior Hockey League arenas
Sports venues in Quebec
Buildings and structures in Saint-Hyacinthe
Sports venues completed in 1937
1937 establishments in Quebec